Strandtown is a district of Belfast. It is in the east of the city, in the BT4 postcode area, lying south of the City Airport and north of the Newtownards Road.

The author C.S. Lewis (1898–1963) lived in the district as a child from 1905 to 1908, at a house called "Little Lea". He later moved to England and achieved fame with a wide range of fiction books, mostly notably The Chronicles of Narnia.

Facilities in the Strandtown area include Strandtown Primary School, Strand Arts Centre and Connswater Community Greenway.

References

Geography of Belfast
Civil parish of Holywood